Lo Chih-tsung (born 14 August 1956) is a Taiwanese football manager, best known for managing the national team. In his first spell, he was manager from 1985 to 1988, and in his second spell, he was manager from 2009 to 2011.

He also teaches at the National Kaohsiung University of Applied Sciences.

External links
Lo's introduction at National Kaohsiung University of Applied Sciences web site 

Living people
Taiwanese footballers
Taiwanese football managers
Chinese Taipei national football team managers
Association footballers not categorized by position
1956 births